Peter Steiner may refer to:
 Peter Steiner (singer)
 Peter Steiner (cartoonist)
 Peter O. Steiner, economist